Acleris praeterita is a species of moth of the family Tortricidae. It is found in South Korea.

References

Moths described in 1991
praeterita
Moths of Korea